Dolunay may refer to:

 Dolunay (TV series)
 Dolunay, Kemaliye, Turkey
 Dolunay, Lice, Turkey
 Dolunay, Şenkaya, Turkey
 Dolunay Soysert (born 1973), Turkish actress
 Burcu Dolunay (born 1984), Turkish freestyle swimmer
 Mehmet Ozan Dolunay (born 1990), Turkish actor